Kota the Triceratops was an animatronic toy dinosaur made by Hasbro and Playskool. It is modeled after a triceratops, and intended for children aged 3 to 6.

The toy debuted at Toy Fair New York in February 2007, building on the reception of Ugobe's earlier Pleo robotic dinosaur toy, and went on sale in October 2007 for approximately US$300 as listed by the company website. A review by IEEE Spectrum indicated that it had 11 sensors over its body to sense touch and pressure, and made appropriate noises (like roars) or movements (like tail-wagging) in response. It had some functionality to accept a folded "leaf" food and move its jaw and make appropriate chomping noises.

External links
 Print review of Kota by IEEE Spectrum.
 Video review of Kota by IEEE Spectrum.

Toy brands
Entertainment robots
Robotic dinosaurs
2000s toys
Hasbro products
Robots of the United States
2008 robots
Animatronic robots
Toy animals